The Bielefeld Opera is the venue of Städtische Bühnen Bielefeld (Municipal stages Bielefeld) in Bielefeld, Germany. It is a Dreisparten Haus (three-department house), offering plays, music (opera, musical theatre), and ballet. The main performance venue is the Stadttheater am Niederwall (Municipal Theatre at the Lower Wall), built in 1904 and extensively renovated from 2004 to 2006. It is the largest theater in East Westphalia, offering 500 performances annually. It is under the direction of Michael Heicks; its resident orchestra is the 72-member Bielefeld Philharmonic Orchestra that also performs symphonic concerts at the Rudolf-Oetker-Halle.

History 
Plans to build an opera house in Bielefeld were laid in 1885 by a foundation set up the widow of the founder of the Crüwell Tobacco Company. Bernhard Sehring was chosen as architect and construction was started in 1901 on the Niederwall. The Art Nouveau building was inaugurated with a performance of Carl Maria von Weber's Der Freischütz on 3 April 1904.

The financial crisis in the 1920s led to discussions about reducing the number of employees or amalgamating with neighboring theaters in Münster and Osnabrück. When the Nazis came to power in 1933, Director Max Cahnbley was fired and replaced by Leon Geer. The building was rebuilt in 1937 but badly damaged during the bombing of Bielefeld on the night of 26 October 1944.

It proved difficult to restart normal theater life immediately after the war as the British administration forbade drama performances. Nevertheless, the opera house reopened on 1 December 1945 with a performance of Mozart's The Magic Flute. During the renovation of the building in 1960, it was decided not to renew the Art Nouveau façade; it was reconstructed for the 75th jubilee in 1979.

The Theater Foundation Bielefeld was founded in 2001 with the purpose of renovating the building again at a cost of €23 million. It was closed in 2004 for two years, but the opera ensemble continued to perform in the Rudolf-Oetker-Halle. The opera house reopened on 19 September 2006, with a performance of Mozart's The Marriage of Figaro.

Opernwunder 
Between 1975 and 1998, under Director Heiner Bruns and dramaturge Alexander Gruber, the Bielefeld Opera became internationally renowned as the Bielefelder Opernwunder ("Bielefeld Opera miracle"), producing a series of successful rediscoveries and premiere performances. The team, which included John Dew as stage director, Gottfried Pilz as stage designer; Rainer Koch, David de Villiers, and Geoffrey Moull as conductors, helped Bielefeld Opera attract attention of the national German and British press; critics from Gramophone, the Financial Times, and New York (Opera News) became regular visitors.

Programming philosophy 

In addition to operas like Lohengrin, Così fan tutte, Der Rosenkavalier and Aida, several dramaturgical leitmotifs were to be found in the programming of the Opernwunder years of the Bruns era. A number of operas from the Entartete Kunst (degenerate art) period were performed for the first time since being banned by the Nazis in the 1930s. Publishers and opera house staff recreated lost orchestral materials for productions of Bohuslav Martinů's Julietta, Karol Rathaus' Fremde Erde, and Ernst Toch's Der Fächer. German romantic operas that had been lost since the 19th century were given new life, thus the rediscovery of Robert Schumann's Genoveva, Louis Spohr's Faust and Carl Maria von Weber's Die drei Pintos for the operatic stage. Some operas from abroad received their European premieres in Bielefeld, such as John Adams' Nixon in China and Shulamit Ran's Der Dybbuk. The Bielefeld Opera also produced a number of world premieres, including Nikolai Karetnikov's Till Eulenspiegel and  Das stille Zimmer.

Operatic productions 
Nearly half of all new productions of the Bielefeld Opera between 1980 and 1998 were of innovative operas, including:

Rudi Stephan: Die erste Menschen
Franz Schreker: Irrelohe
Franz Schreker: Der Schmied von Gent
Franz Schreker: Der singende Teufel
Erich Wolfgang Korngold: Das Wunder der Heliane
Karol Rathaus: Fremde Erde
André Grétry: Zemire und Azor
Thea Musgrave: Maria Stuart
George Antheil: Transatlantik
Erwin Dressel: Armer Columbus
Leonard Bernstein: A Quiet Place
Frederick Delius: Fennimore and Gerda
Giacomo Meyerbeer: Der Prophet
Ernst Krenek: Der Sprung über den Schatten
Ernst Krenek: Die Zwingburg
Ernst Krenek: Der Diktator
Rudolf Mors: Der Kreidekreis (1983, premiere)
Fromental Halévy: Die Jüdin
John Adams: Nixon in China
Douglas Moore: Die Ballade von Baby Doe
Bohuslav Martinů: Julietta
Robert Schumann: Genoveva
Louis Spohr: Faust
Roberto Gerhard: The Duenna
Nikolai Karetnikov: Till Eulenspiegel (1993, premiere)
Judith Weir: Der blonde Eckbert
Ernst Toch: Der Fächer
Carl Maria von Weber/Gustav Mahler: Die drei Pintos
Theo Loevendie: Esmée (about Esmée van Eeghen)
Luigi Dallapiccola: Il prigioniero
Kurt Weill: Die Bürgschaft
Shulamit Ran: Der Dybbuk
Michael Hirsch: Das stille Zimmer

CD recordings 
The Bielefeld Opera has produced the following complete opera recordings:

Ernst Krenek: Der Sprung über den Schatten. Thomas Brüning, Lynda Kemeny, Susan Maclean, Diana Amos, John Pflieger, Ulrich Neuweiler, Jörg Dürmüller, Bielefeld Opera Chorus, Bielefeld Philharmonic Orchestra, David de Villiers. cpo 999 082-2, 1990
Louis Spohr: Faust (1852 version). Michael Vier, Eelco von Jordis, William Pugh, Diane Jennings, Ion Bric, Claudia Taha, Bielefeld Opera Chorus, Bielefeld Philharmonic Orchestra, Geoffrey Moull. cpo 999 247-2, 1993
Viktor Ullmann Der Sturz des Antichrist Ulrich Neuweiler, Richard Decker, William Oberholzer, Louis Gentile, Monte Jaffe, Lassi Partanen, Bielefeld Opera Chorus, Bielefeld Philharmonic Orchestra, Rainer Koch. cpo 999 321-2, 1996
Theo Loevendie: Esmée. Margaret Thompson, William Oberholtzer, Luca Martin, Monte Jaffe, Ulrich Neuweiler, Maja Tabatadze, Nikolaus Bergmann, Bielefeld Opera Chorus, Bielefeld Philharmonic Orchestra, Geoffrey Moull. Donemus CV 74/75, 1998

References

External links 
 
 (in German)

German opera companies
Buildings and structures in Bielefeld
Theatres in Germany
Art Nouveau architecture in Germany
1904 establishments in Germany
Theatres completed in 1904
Opera houses in Germany
Music venues completed in 1904
Art Nouveau theatres